Micranthes oregana is a species of flowering plant known by the common name Oregon saxifrage. It is native to western North America, including the mountainous regions of the western United States. It can be found in moist habitat, such as marshes and other wetlands. It is a perennial herb growing from a thick, fleshy or woody caudex. It produces a basal rosette of linear to lance-shaped leaves each up to 25 centimeters long. The inflorescence arises on a stout peduncle which may exceed a meter in height. It is topped with one or more dense clusters of white-petaled flowers.

External links
Jepson Manual Treatment
Washington Burke Museum
Photo gallery

oregana
Flora of the Northwestern United States
Flora of California
Flora of the Cascade Range
Flora of the Klamath Mountains
Flora of the Sierra Nevada (United States)
Plants described in 1895
Flora without expected TNC conservation status